David Douglas (born June 27, 1989) is a former American football wide receiver. He played college football at Arizona. He was signed by the New York Giants as an undrafted rookie free agent on May 11, 2012. He was signed off the Giant's practice squad to the Tampa Bay Buccaneers active roster on November 22, 2012.

External links
 Arizona Wildcats player bio
 Tampa Bay Buccaneers bio

Living people
1989 births
American football wide receivers
Arizona Wildcats football players
Tampa Bay Buccaneers players